Crompton may refer to

Place names 

Crompton (West Warwick), a community in West Warwick, Rhode Island, US
Crompton, Greater Manchester, in Shaw and Crompton, Greater Manchester, England formerly in Lancashire
Crompton Urban District, an obsolete local government district that covered Shaw and Crompton until 1974

Institutions and companies 

Crompton Corporation, a chemical manufacturer headquartered in Connecticut
Crompton House Church of England School, a secondary school in Shaw and Crompton
Crompton Parkinson, British manufacturer of electrical motors, control gear and lamp bulbs
Crompton Greaves Consumer Electricals, Indian manufacturer
Crompton Greaves Power and Industrial Solutions, Indian corporation

Technical and engineering terms 

British Rail Class 33 or Crompton, a class of diesel-electric locomotive

People 
Crompton (surname), an English surname

See also
Compton (disambiguation)